Kaynakdüzü is a village in the Adaklı District, Bingöl Province, Turkey. The village is populated by Kurds and had a population of 279 in 2021.

The hamlets of Bent, Doğanca, Kantar, Karakoç, Kole, Mendelli, Sırasöğütler and Simhaç yaylası are attached to the village.

References 

Villages in Adaklı District
Kurdish settlements in Bingöl Province